Part of the Northern Crusades, the Swedish Crusades were campaigns by Sweden in Finland and Novgorod. They include:
First Swedish Crusade (1150s)
Second Swedish Crusade (1240s)
Third Swedish Crusade (1293)
Swedish–Novgorodian Wars

Christianization of Europe
Northern Crusades